Dana Grace Goski (born 1967) is a Canadian-born materials scientist, past president (October 2020–October 2021) of The American Ceramic Society (ACerS), and vice president of research & development at Allied Mineral Products, Inc. During her tenure as ACerS president, she extensively supported the mission and activities of the Society's Diversity & Inclusion Subcommittee and the International Ceramic Arts Network (ICAN), the Society's member organization for clay artisans and potters.

Education 
Goski was born in Nova Scotia, Canada. She received her early education at Royal Canadian Air Force Base schools and finished high school in the Nova Scotia public school system. After graduation, she studied chemistry at Dalhousie University in Nova Scotia where she received her B.Sc. in 1989 and M.Sc. in 1992 as a joint project with the National Research Council of Canada (NRC) with a focus on colloidal processing and surface chemistry of alumina and zirconia systems. In 1997, she completed her Ph.D. at the Technical University of Nova Scotia and published her thesis Development of an alumina-mullite composite by reaction sintering.

Career 
In 1996, Goski moved to Columbus, Ohio, to join Allied Mineral Products, a global producer of monolithic refractory materials, as a senior research engineer and technical consultant. In 2009, she was named director of research and development before becoming vice president of research and development in 2018 at Allied, where she guides research in advanced ceramic composites and refractory materials.

Goski was named a Fellow of The American Ceramic Society in 2015, awarded the St. Louis Section Theodore J. Planje Award in 2019, and the Marquis Award in 2020.

Awards and recognition 

 Her patented work on monolithic graphitic castable was recognized with the 2015 ACerS Corporate Technical Achievement Award, given to the Allied Mineral Products team in relation to Goski's patent. In 2019, she was recognized with the Theodore J. Planje Award, given for distinguished achievement in the field of refractories, by the St. Louis Section of ACerS. 
 For her support of leadership priorities, identification of strategic approaches, and ability to rally people together to achieve significant milestones, she was honored with the ACerS Global Ambassador Award (2019). In 2020, Goski was awarded with the John Marquis Memorial Award for her work published in ACerS journals and related to manufacturing in ceramics and glass.
 2015 Fellow of The American Ceramic Society
 2015 ACerS Corporate Technical Achievement Award
 2019 Theodore J. Planje Award
 2019 ACerS Global Ambassador Award
 2020 John Marquis Memorial Award
 2020–2021 President of The American Ceramic Society
 2022 First woman designated as a Distinguished Life Member of the Unified International Technical Conference on Refractories (UNITECR)

References 

Canadian emigrants to the United States
Dalhousie University alumni
Fellows of the American Ceramic Society
Canadian materials scientists
Living people
Women materials scientists and engineers
Scientists from Nova Scotia
1967 births